The year 1954 saw a number of significant happenings in radio broadcasting history.


Events
20 January – The National Negro Network is formed in the United States.
25 January – First broadcast of Dylan Thomas's radio play Under Milk Wood, two months after its author's death, with Richard Burton as 'First Voice', on the BBC Third Programme.
1 February – KECA and KECA-FM, two Los Angeles stations, change their call letters to KABC and KABC-FM respectively, reflecting their new ownership by ABC-United Paramount Theaters.
1 April – ABC-United Paramount Theaters, owners of WENR-Chicago, purchase time-share counterpart WLS-Chicago from Sears, Roebuck and Co., and merge both stations under the WLS call sign (their FM sister station would keep the WENR call sign until 1965).
15 July – The Nippon Broadcasting System initiates its first official regular broadcasting service in Tokyo, Japan.
18 October – Texas Instruments announces the development of the first commercial transistor radio. The Regency TR-1 goes on sale the following month.
17 November – WJW (AM) in Cleveland, Ohio (later WKNR) is sold by William M. O'Neill to Storer Broadcasting.

Debuts
3 January – Man's Right to Knowledge debuts on CBS.
3 January – WSTN debuts as a 1 kW daytimer at St. Augustine, Florida.
9 January – Roadshow debuts on NBC. Starring Bill Cullen, the three-hour weekly program is considered a forerunner of the network's Monitor, which began a year later.
6 April – Crime and Peter Chambers debuts on NBC.
2 September – Dr. Sixgun debuts on NBC.
25 October - WMSN in Raleigh, North Carolina debuts as a 500 watt daytimer at Raleigh, North Carolina.
2 November – Hancock's Half Hour debuts on BBC radio.

Endings 
3 January – Quiz Kids ends its run on network radio (CBS). 
6 January – Dr. Christian ends its run on network radio (CBS). 
15 January – Double or Nothing ends its run on network radio (ABC). 
16 January – The Baron and the Bee ends its run on network radio (NBC). 
5 March – Family Skeleton ends its run on network radio (CBS).
12 March – House of Glass ends its run on network radio (NBC).  
26 March – Front Page Farrell ends its run on network radio (NBC). 
27 March – Twenty Questions ends its run on network radio. 
28 March – Bulldog Drummond ends its run on network radio (Mutual). 
30 March – Rocky Fortune, a half-hour detective drama starring Frank Sinatra, aired its final episode on NBC. 
22 May – The Armstrong Theater of Today ends its run on network radio (CBS). 
27 May – Time for Love ends its run on network radio (CBS).
18 June – The Adventures of Ozzie and Harriet ends its run on network radio (ABC). 
24 June – The Six Shooter ends its run on network radio (NBC). 
9 July – Can You Top This? ends its run on network radio (NBC). 
1 August – Broadway Is My Beat ends its run on network radio (CBS). 
7 September – Crime and Peter Chambers ends its run on network radio (NBC). 
25 September – Escape ends its run on CBS.
25 September – Stars over Hollywood ends its run on network radio (CBS).
30 September – On Stage (radio show) ends its run on network radio (CBS).
3 September – The Lone Ranger ends its run of original radio shows.
27 November – The Falcon ends its run on network radio (Mutual).
26 December – Man's Right to Knowledge ends its run on network radio (CBS).
(undated) – The Jack Berch Show ends its run on network radio (ABC).

Births
12 January – Howard Stern, American shock jock radio personality
22 August – Kurt Andersen, American novelist, columnist and public radio host
26 August – Steve Wright, English DJ
27 August – Andrew Marshall, English comedy scriptwriter
8 September – Joe Cipriano, American voice over actor and radio personality
20 November – Steve Dahl, American radio personality and humorist
27 November – Arthur Smith, English comedian and radio presenter
5 December – Peter Arbogast, American sportscaster

Deaths
10 January – Chester Wilmot, Australian war correspondent, killed in accident to BOAC Flight 781 (born 1911)
4 November – Joy Hathaway, Canadian-born American actress of the Golden Age of Radio

References

 
Radio by year